Millstream Career Center is a public vocational school located in Findlay, Ohio next to Findlay High School at 1150 Broad Avenue.  It serves school districts located in the counties of Allen, Hancock, Hardin, Putnam, Seneca, Wood and Wyandot.

Operation 
The current Millstream Career Center building opened in 2012. In 2019 850 students attended the career center.

The career center hosts a number of programs, including fields such as healthcare, robotics, engineering, computer networking, welding, and cyber security.

The Career Center partners with other organizations such as the University of Findlay and the Toledo Zoo & Aquarium to offer hands on training.

Associate schools 
Enrollment is open to students from any of Millstream's thirteen partner schools.

Arcadia High School
Arlington High School
Carey High School
Cory-Rawson High School
Findlay High School
Leipsic High School
Liberty-Benton High School
McComb High School
Miller City High School
Ottawa-Glandorf High School 
Pandora-Gilboa High School
Van Buren High School
Vanlue High School

References

Vocational schools in Ohio
High schools in Hancock County, Ohio
Education in Ohio
Public high schools in Ohio